Dahaneh is a village in Fasharud Rural District, in the Central District of Birjand County, South Khorasan Province, Iran. At the 2016 census, its population was 13, in 4 families.

References 

Populated places in Birjand County